Bass River is a small farming and forestry community located in Weldford Parish, New Brunswick that developed around the Bass River, a fresh water tributary of the Richibucto River.  Bass River is located between the Intersection of Route 116 and Route 490.

History

In 1871 Bass River had a population of 400, in 1898 Bass River had 1 post office, 3 stores, 1 gristmill, 2 churches, and a population of 350.

Bass River is home of the Bass River County Fair held annually on July 12 weekend since 1974. The week-long celebration of local English, Irish and Scot's heritage has featured events such as the double horse haul, a parade, horse and car shows, circus rides and games for family and children as well as providing top notch New Brunswick musical entertainment from artists such as Kevin Chase and Don Coleman. A weekend regular at Bass River Country Club is country music singer and songwriter, Valerie Thompson with Heartland who makes her home in Bass River and the community is also home to a rock and roll band named Cactus Tung, once featured on the New Brunswick Music website. The community center hosts a softball field, outdoor skating rink, horse show display spaces and barn, picnic area, playground equipment and open spaces available for the communities enjoyment.

Thompson's General Store in Bass River has a long-standing history, conveniently located along Route 116 and currently owned by Glen Thompson of GlenHar Builders Ltd., Quispamsis, New Brunswick. Glen was raised in Bass River and the Thompson family of Northern Ireland with Scottish roots has long standing roots in the community with a Road from St. Mark's Presbyterian Church to Mrs. Thompson's constructed in 1854. The church, near Walker's Mill, a thriving business in the 1880s, was constructed about the year 1840 and was the center of community living for early settlers to the area  including surnames Campbell, Keswick, Walker, Stewart, McKendrick and McDougall.

Other local businesses in 2010 include some specializing in New Brunswick Hunting Adventures such as Upriver Outfitters.

See also
List of communities in New Brunswick
List of people from Kent County, New Brunswick

References

Communities in Kent County, New Brunswick